Margaret Wilson  (born 24 February 1953) is a former judge of the Supreme Court of Queensland in the Trial Division. She was appointed a Queen's Counsel in 1992 and served on the court from 1998 until 2014. She is also a graduate of the University of Queensland school of law.

In 2014 she was appointed a judge of the Solomon Islands Court of Appeal.

See also

List of judges of the Supreme Court of Queensland

References

Judges of the Supreme Court of Queensland
Australian judges on the courts of the Solomon Islands
20th-century Australian judges
21st-century Australian judges
Australian women judges
Living people
1953 births
People from Brisbane
20th-century women judges
21st-century women judges
Australian King's Counsel
20th-century Australian women